St Day is a civil parish and village in Cornwall, England, United Kingdom. It is situated between the village of Chacewater and the town of Redruth. The electoral ward St Day and Lanner had a population at the 2011 census of 4,473.

St Day is located in a former mining area (which included Poldice, Tolcarne,  Todpool, Creegbrawse and Crofthandy) and accrued considerable wealth from mining. The parish is at the heart of the Cornwall and West Devon Mining Landscape, a World Heritage Site  that includes St Agnes, Chapel Porth and Porthtowan.

Industrial history 
St Day was a centre for the richest and perhaps most famous copper mining district in the world from the 16th century to the 1830s. The population, wealth and activity in St Day declined steadily from about 1870 onwards, today the population is smaller than in 1841. It is now essentially a residential village.

The Wheal Gorland mine is the type locality for the minerals: chenevixite, clinoclase, cornwallite, kernowite, and liroconite.

The population of St Day was 1,821 at the census 2011

Social  
St Day Feast occurs during the summer within the village, it consists in part, two formal street dances similar to that in Helston. The children's dance involves the children of St Day and Carharrack Primary School.

A St Day mine site has been used for short-oval stock car racing for many years. Stock car drivers from Cornwall have won 11 World Championships.

Parish church
The parish was originally a chapelry of Gwennap but became independent in 1835. In the 13th century there was a chapel dedicated to the Holy Trinity and even earlier there had been a chapel dedicated to St Day which was a great centre of pilgrimage. The saint commemorated here is probably the Breton Saint Dei.

The "Sans Day Carol" or "St. Day Carol" is one of the many Cornish Christmas carols written in the 19th century. This carol and its melody were first transcribed from the singing of Thomas Beard who lived in this parish.

References

External links

 St Day Civil Parish Council website
 Cornwall Record Office Online Catalogue for St Day
 GENUKI website; St Day

Villages in Cornwall
Civil parishes in Cornwall
Mining in Cornwall